The Sons of Neptune was a group of colonial sailors directly associated with and on whom the Sons of Liberty may have been based. They were active before and during the American Revolution. Among those affiliated with the Sons of Neptune are John Lamb, John Morin Scott and Issac Sears. The Sons of Neptune began to defend themselves against trade restrictions imposed by the British. They were involved in the Stamp Act Crisis, the Townsend Acts, and the Boston Tea Party.

References 

 

American Revolution
National liberation movements
Patriotic societies
Patriots in the American Revolution